Vasilis Papakonstantinou is the eponymous debut album from Vasilis Papakonstantinou. It was recorded after his return from touring abroad as a singer for Mikis Theodorakis's tour. Most of the songs for the album are originals written by singer-songwriter Antonis Vardis (who also contributed most of the guitar work in the album) with lyrics by Panos Falaras. The album also includes the first attempt as a songwriter by the popular singer Haris Alexiou. The remaining songs are covers:  two by Catalan singer-songwriter Lluis Llach with Greek lyrics by Falaras, a song by singer-songwriter Dionysis Savvopoulos (originally from his 1966 debut album To fortigo), a Thanos Mikroutsikos song (originally from his 1975 Politika tragoudia debut album), and a Mikis Theodorakis song (from his Arcadia II song cycle written in 1969 during his house arrest and first recorded for his 1974 New songs album).

The arrangements for the songs were by Kostas Ganoselis, who also plays keyboards on this album. Ganoselis worked with Papakonstantinou on three more albums in the first half of the 1980s.

Personnel

Antonis Vardis – classical, acoustic, 12-string, and electric guitars
Kostas Ganoselis – piano, synthesizer, glockenspiel
Michalis Tripolitsiotis – bass guitar
Tassos Diakogiorgis – drums
Giorgos Tsoupakis – percussion
Dimitris Vraskos – violin
Nikos Avgeris – violin
Dimitris Doufexiadis – cello
Gerasimos Ioannidis – trumpet
Giannis Elefantis – trombone

Track listing

1978 debut albums
Vasilis Papakonstantinou albums